Yanks Go Home is a British sitcom about U.S. Army Air Forcemen stationed in Lancashire, England in the Second World War. It was produced and directed by Eric Prytherch for Granada Television and broadcast on ITV between 1976 and 1977. The series ran for 2 series and 13 episodes in total before its cancellation.

Plot
The series focused on a group of U.S. Army Air Force pilots stationed in a small northern town in Lancashire, England during the Second World War and their sometimes tense relationship with the local men, most often over the attentions of the young women in the town. The early interactions and friction between British civilians and the U.S. military during WWII, best summed up by the wartime slogan of American servicemen "over paid, over sexed, and over here", was intentionally played up for humorous effect in the series.

Characters
Phoebe Sankey (Meg Johnson)
Sgt. Gus Polaski (Bruce Boa)
Cpl. Vince Rossi (Stuart Damon)
Doreen Sankey (Catherine Neilson)
Harry Duckworth (David Ross)
Bert Pickup (Harry Markham)
Cpl. Pasquale (Freddie Earlle)
Col. Ralph Kruger (Alan MacNaughtan)
Col. Irving (Lionel Murton)
Pfc. Burford Puckett (Richard Oldfield)
Leonard Chambers (Norman Bird)
Pvt. Floyd Tutt (Jay Benedict)

Episodes

Series 1

Series 2

Reception
Upon the premiere of the first episode, originally aired on 22 November 1976, the show's title "Yanks Go Home" raised some mild controversy as the United States had celebrated its bicentennial months before. The show received considerable publicity from the network and appeared on the cover of TV Times.

The show failed to meet the network's expectations however, mostly due to the concept already having been touched upon in Dad's Army (such as in the episode My British Buddy, 3 years and 15 days broadcast before the first episode) but also because of the lack of a regular writing staff. Nearly each episode was written by a different writer which created noticeable inconsistencies as the series progressed. The studio-based setting and canned laughter    also lessened the feel in comparison with Dad's Army. The show was cancelled a year later, the final episode airing on 19 September 1977, and was never brought back for a third.

One of the breakout stars of the show was Freddie Earlle (who was in Dad's Army, It Ain't Half Hot Mum and Hi-de-Hi!) whose character Corporal Pasquale was favourably compared to Sgt. Bilko. The series also featured Stuart Damon of The Champions'', who also wrote one episode.

DVD releases

The Complete Series is set to be released on 5 March 2012 by Network DVD.

References

External links

1976 British television series debuts
1977 British television series endings
1970s British sitcoms
ITV sitcoms
World War II television comedy series
Military comedy television series
Aviation television series
Television shows produced by Granada Television
English-language television shows